Miho Klaić (Dubrovnik, August 19, 1829 – Zadar, January 3, 1896) was a Croatian politician and a leader of the Croatian revival in Dalmatia.

He obtained a PhD in architecture in Padua, Italy. He was a member of the National Party and was elected as member of the Diet of Dalmatia in the National Committee. Miho Klaić was President of the Diet of Dalmatia and created the newspaper Il Nazionale.

Despite the persecution of the Austrian government, he fought all his life for the introduction of Croatian into education and demanded the administrative union of the Kingdom of Croatia-Slavonia with Dalmatia.

References
 Opća i nacionalna enciklopedija, Zagreb, 2005-2007

1829 births
1896 deaths
People from Dubrovnik
People from the Kingdom of Dalmatia
People's Party (Dalmatia) politicians
Members of the Austrian House of Deputies (1873–1879)
Members of the Austrian House of Deputies (1879–1885)
Members of the Austrian House of Deputies (1885–1891)
Members of the Austrian House of Deputies (1891–1897)